Pietro Leoni (2 April 1637 – 17 December 1697) was a Roman Catholic prelate who served as Bishop of Verona (1691–1697) and Bishop of Ceneda (1667–1691).

Biography
Pietro Leoni was born in Venice, Italy on 2 April 1637 and ordained a priest on 25 September 1667.
On 14 November 1667, he was appointed during the papacy of Pope Clement IX as Bishop of Ceneda.
On 20 November 1667, he was consecrated bishop by Pietro Vito Ottoboni, Cardinal-Priest of San Marco, with Carlo Stefano Anastasio Ciceri, Bishop of Alessandria della Paglia, and Francesco Grassi, Bishop of Nona, serving as co-consecrators. 
On 26 November 1691, he was appointed during the papacy of Pope Innocent XII as Bishop of Verona.
He served as Bishop of Verona until his death on 17 December 1697.

Episcopal succession
While bishop, he was the principal consecrator of:
Giacomo Bruti, Bishop of Novigrad (1671); 
Alessandro Adezario, Bishop of Poreč (1671); 
and the principal co-consecrator of:
Gianalberto Badoer, Patriarch of Venice (1688).

References

External links and additional sources
 (for Chronology of Bishops) 
 (for Chronology of Bishops) 
 (for Chronology of Bishops) 
 (for Chronology of Bishops) 

17th-century Roman Catholic bishops in the Republic of Venice
Bishops appointed by Pope Clement IX
Bishops appointed by Pope Innocent XII
1637 births
1697 deaths